David Siegel is an American film director, screenwriter, and producer, and part of a long-standing writing-directing-producing team with the filmmaker Scott McGehee.

Filmography

Feature films

Executive producer
 The Business of Strangers (2001)
 Life of the Party (2018)

Interviews
 Filmmaker Magazine interview: "David Siegel and Scott McGehee, 'Uncertainty'"
 Time Out New York interview: "TONY Q&A: What Maisie Knew’s Scott McGehee and David Siegel"

External links
 

American male screenwriters
Living people
People from Orange County, California
University of California, Berkeley alumni
Film directors from California
Film producers from California
Screenwriters from California
Year of birth missing (living people)